Broadfield or Broadfields may refer to:

England
Broadfield, Greater Manchester, a United Kingdom location
Broadfield railway station, 1869–1970
Broadfield, Hertfordshire
Broadfield, Leyland, Lancashire, a United Kingdom location
Broadfield, Oswaldtwistle, Lancashire, a United Kingdom location
Broadfield, West Sussex, a neighborhood within the town of Crawley
Broadfield (electoral division), a West Sussex County Council constituency
Broadfield Stadium
Broadfields Estate, London

Other places
Broadfield, Inverclyde, Scotland,  a United Kingdom location
Broadfield, Pembrokeshire, Wales
Broadfield, New Zealand, New Zealand